Please add names of notable painters with a Wikipedia page, in precise English alphabetical order, using U.S. spelling conventions. Country and regional names refer to where painters worked for long periods, not to personal allegiances.

Betye Saar (born 1926), American assemblage artist
Gaetano Sabatini (1703–1734), Italian draftsman and painter
Jacques Sablet (1749–1803), French painter
Pieter Jansz Saenredam (1597–1665), Dutch painter and muralist
Cornelis Saftleven (1607–1681), Dutch painter
Herman Saftleven (1609–1685), Dutch painter
Sara Saftleven (1645–1702), Dutch painter
Kay Sage (1898–1963), American artist and poet
Anne Said (1914–1995), English artist
Jean-Pierre Saint-Ours (1752–1809), Swiss painter
Saitō Kiyoshi (斎藤清, 1907–1997), Japanese sōsaku-hanga artist
Sakai Hōitsu (酒井抱一, 1761–1828), Japanese painter
Adam Saks (born 1974), Danish painter
Emilio Grau Sala (1911–1975), Spanish (Catalan)/French painter and illustrator
Tahir Salahov (1928–2021), Soviet (Azerbaijani)/Russian painter and draftsman
Stanislaw Samostrzelnik (1480–1541), Polish painter, decorator and Cistercian monk
Joop Sanders (born 1921), Dutch/American painter and educator
Hans Sandreuter (1850–1901), Swiss artist and designer
Bernat Sanjuan (1915–1979), Spanish (Catalan) painter and sculptor
John Singer Sargent (1856–1925), American painter and draftsman
Michael Aloysius Sarisky (1906–1974), Hungarian/American Hungarian painter
Andrea del Sarto (1487–1531), Italian painter
Arthur Sarkissian (born 1960), Armenian painter
Martiros Saryan (1880–1972), Armenian painter
Wilhelm Sasnal (born 1972), Polish painter, illustrator and film-maker
Satake Yoshiatsu (佐竹義敦, 1748–1785), Japanese painter and feudal lord
Junpei Satoh (佐藤淳平, born 1956), Japanese painter
Raymond Saunders (born 1934), American assemblage artist and draftsman
Antonio Saura (1930–1998), Spanish painter and writer
Anne Savage (1896–1971), Canadian painter and art teacher
Jacob Savery (1566–1603), Flemish/Dutch painter, etcher and draftsman
Roelant Savery (1576–1639), Dutch painter
Jenny Saville (born 1970), English painter
Konstantin Savitsky (1844–1905), Russian painter
Alexei Kondratyevich Savrasov (1830–1897), Russian painter
János Saxon-Szász (born 1964), Hungarian creative artist
Sawa Sekkyō (沢雪嶠, fl. late 18th/early 19th centuries) Japanese painter
Jan Sawka (born 1946), Polish/American artist and architect
Fikret Muallâ Saygı (1903–1967), Turkish painter
Godfried Schalcken (1643–1706), Dutch painter
Louis Schanker (1903–1981), American artist
Hugo Scheiber (1873–1950), Hungarian/German painter
Egon Schiele (1890–1918), Austrian painter
Oszkar Tordai Schilling (fl. late 19th century), Hungarian etcher and draftsman
Jakub Schikaneder (1855–1924), Austro-Hungarian (Bohemian)/Czechoslovak painter
Helene Schjerfbeck (1862–1946), Finnish painter
Rudolf Schlichter (1890–1955), German painter
Richard Schmid (born 1934), American artist
Georg Friedrich Schmidt (1712–1775), German engraver and designer
Johann George Schmidt (1707–1774), German Baroque architect
Hans Werner Schmidt (1859–1950), German painter, illustrator and etcher
Karl Schmidt-Rottluff (1884–1976), German painter and print-maker
Ruth Schmidt Stockhausen (1922-2014), German painter, graphic artist and sculptor
Randall Schmit (born 1955), American painter
Stella Schmolle (1908–1975), English painter
Julian Schnabel (born 1952), American painter and film-maker
Wilhelm Schnarrenberger (1892–1966), German painter
Gérard Ernest Schneider (1896–1986), Swiss painter
Georg Scholz (1890–1945), German painter
Floris van Schooten (1590–1655), Dutch painter
Otto Marseus van Schrieck (1619–1678), Dutch painter
Georg Schrimpf (1889–1938), German painter and graphic artist
Adolf Schrödter (1805–1875), German painter and illustrator
Daniel Schultz (1615–1683), Polish-Lithuanian painter
Ethel Schwabacher (1903–1984), American painter
Carlos Schwabe (1877–1926), Swiss painter and print-maker
Randolph Schwabe (1885–1948), English painter and etcher
Hans Schwarz (1922–2003), Austrian portrait painter
Kurt Schwitters (1887–1948), German artist
Alexander Scott (1872–1932), English/American painter
Caroline Lucy Scott (1784–1857), English landscape painter and novelist
Kathleen Scott (1878–1947), English sculptor
Peter Scott (1909–1989), English artist and conservationist
Richard T. Scott (born 1980), American history painter and writer
Samuel Scott (1703–1772), English painter and etcher
Tom Scott RSA (1854–1927), Scottish painter
William Edouard Scott (1884–1964), American artist
Eduardo Lefebvre Scovell (1864–1918), English/American artist
Sean Scully (born 1945), Irish/American painter, sculptor and photographer
Felipe Seade (1912–1969), Uruguayan painter and teacher
Otakar Sedloň (1885–1973), Austro-Hungarian (Czech)/Czechoslovak painter
Richard Sedlon (1900–1991), American painter
Lasar Segall (1891–1957), German/Brazilian painter, engraver and sculptor
Daniel Seghers (1590–1661), Flemish painter and Jesuit brother
Gerard Seghers (1591–1651), Flemish painter and art collector
Hercules Seghers (1589–1638), Dutch painter and print-maker
Kurt Seligmann (1900–1962), Swiss/American painter and engraver
Manuel Rendón Seminario (1894–1982), French/Ecuadorian painter
Jacek Sempoliński (born 1927), Polish painter, draftsman and critic
Sengai (仙厓義梵, 1750–1837), Japanese sumi-e painter
Sohrab Sepehri (1928–1980), Iranian poet and painter
Zinaida Serebriakova (1884–1967), Russian/French painter
Valentin Aleksandrovich Serov (1865–1911), Russian painter
Clément Serveau (1886–1972), French painter, engraver and illustrator
Bela Čikoš Sesija (1864–1931), Austro-Hungarian (Croat)/Yugoslav painter, art teacher and academy founder
Sesshū Tōyō (雪舟等楊, 1420–1506), Japanese ink and wash painter
James Sessions American painter (1882-1962)
Henriett Seth F. (born 1980), Hungarian artist, poet and musician
Georges Seurat (1859–1891), French artist
Gino Severini (1883–1966), Italian painter
Joseph Severn (1793–1879), English painter
Shang Xi (商喜, fl. c. 1430–1440), Chinese painter
Emily Shanks (1857–1936), Russian/English painter
Charles Haslewood Shannon (1863–1937), English painter and lithographer
Shao Mi (邵彌, c. 1592–1642), Chinese painter, calligrapher and poet
Harold Shapinsky (1925–2004), American painter
Tōshūsai Sharaku (東洲斎写楽, 1794–1795), Japanese ukiyo-e print designer
Sylvester Shchedrin (1791–1830), Russian painter
Millard Sheets (1907–1989), American artist, teacher and administrator
Samuel Shelley (1750–1808), English miniaturist
Rupert Shephard (1909–1992), English painter and illustrator
Shen Che-Tsai (沈哲哉, 1926–2017), Chinese (Taiwanese) painter
Shen Quan (沈銓, 1682–1760), Chinese painter
Shen Shichong (沈士充, fl. 14th, 15th or 16th century), Chinese painter
Shen Zhou (沈周, 1427–1509), Chinese painter
Sheng Mao (盛懋, fl. late 13th or 14th century), Chinese painter
Sheng Maoye (盛茂燁, fl. 14th, 15th or 16th century), Chinese painter
Shi Rui (石銳, fl. 14th or 15th century), Chinese painter
Shi Zhonggui (史忠貴, born 1954), Chinese painter, philosopher and poet
Shiba Kōkan (司馬江漢, 1747–1818), Japanese painter and print-maker
Shibata Zeshin (司馬江漢, 1807–1891), Japanese painter and lacquer and print artist
Kitao Shigemasa (北尾重政, 1739–1820), Japanese ukiyo-e painter
Shōzō Shimamoto (嶋本昭三, born 1928), Japanese artist
Kanzan Shimomura (下村 観山, 1873–1930), Japanese nihonga painter
Siona Shimshi (born 1939), Israeli painter, sculptor and ceramicist
Shin Saimdang (신사임당, 1504–1551), Korean artist, calligraphist and poet
Shin Yun-bok (신윤복, 1758–1813), Korean painter
Shingei (真芸, 1431–1485), Japanese yamato-e painter
Everett Shinn (1876–1953), American painter
Shinoda Toko (篠田桃紅, born 1913), Japanese sumi ink painter and print-maker
Ivan Shishkin (1832–1898), Russian painter
Shitao (石濤, 1642–1707), Chinese painter
Harry Shoulberg (1903–1995), American painter
Shūbun Tenshō (天章周文, died c. 1444–1450), Japanese painter and Zen Buddhist monk
Shukei Sesson (雪村, 1504–1589), Japanese painter and Zen monk
Daryush Shokof (born 1954), Iranian artist, film director and writer
Kevin A. Short (born 1960), American painter and print-maker
Edward Scrope Shrapnel (1845-1920), Canadian painter
Ram Chandra Shukla (born 1925), Indian painter and art critic
Shunbaisai Hokuei (春梅斎北英, died 1837), Japanese ukiyo-e woodblock print-maker
Shunkōsai Hokushū (春好斎北洲, fl. 1802–1832), Japanese ukiyo-e woodblock print-maker
Walter Sickert (1860–1942), English painter and print-maker
Gregorius Sickinger (1558–1631), Swiss painter, draftsman and engraver
Henryk Siemiradzki (1843–1902), Polish/Italian painter
Paul Signac (1863–1935), French painter
Telemaco Signorini (1835–1901), Italian artist
Ramón Silva (1890–1919), Argentine painter
Sim Sa-jeong (심사정, 1707–1769), Korean painter
Josef Šíma (1891–1971), Austro-Hungarian (Czech)/Czechoslovak painter
Hugo Simberg (1873–1917), Finnish painter and graphic artist
Józef Simmler (1823–1868), Polish painter
Sidney Simon (1917–1997), American painter, sculptor and war artist
Edward Simmons (1852–1931), American painter and muralist
Enrique Simonet (1866–1927), Spanish painter
David Simpson (born 1928), American painter
Ruth Simpson (1889–1964), English painter
William Simpson (c. 1818 – 1872), African American portrait painter.
Oliver Sin (born 1985), Hungarian painter and science illustrator
Sin Wi (신위, 1769–1847), Korean painter and scholar
David Alfaro Siqueiros (1896–1974), Mexican painter and muralist
Mario Sironi (1885–1961), Italian painter
Alfred Sisley (1839–1899), French painter
Michael Sittow (1469–1525), Netherlandish/Spanish royal painter
Robert Sivell (1888–1958), Scottish painter
Archibald Skirving (1749–1819), Scottish portrait painter
P.C. Skovgaard (1817–1875), Danish painter
Antonín Slavíček (1870–1910), Austro-Hungarian (Czech) painter
Fyodor Slavyansky (1817–1876), Russian painter
Sylvia Sleigh (1916–2010), English/American painter
Max Slevogt (1868–1932), German painter and illustrator
Władysław Ślewiński (1854–1918), Polish/French painter
Pieter Cornelisz van Slingelandt (1640–1691), Dutch painter
Hamilton Sloan (born 1946), Northern Irish painter
John Sloan (1871–1951), American painter and etcher
Arie Smit (1916–2016), Dutch/Indonesian painter
Grace Cossington Smith (1892–1984), Australian painter
Jack Smith (1928–2011), English artist
Leon Polk Smith (1906–1996), American painter
Matthew Smith (1879–1959), English painter
Xanthus Russell Smith (1839–1929), American painter
Franciszek Smuglewicz (1745–1807), Polish/Lithuanian draftsman and painter
Eero Snellman (1890–1951), Finnish painter
Peter Snow (1927–2008), English painter, theater designer and teacher
Sylvia Snowden (born 1942), American painter
Joan Snyder (born 1940), American painter
Sō Shiseki (宋紫石, 1715–1786), Japanese painter
Sōami (相阿弥, died 1525), Japanese painter
Gerard Soest (1600–1681), English portrait painter
Koloman Sokol (1902–2003), Austro-Hungarian (Slovak)/Czechoslovak painter, graphic artist and illustrator
Xul Solar (1887–1963), Argentine painter, sculptor and writer
Josep Rovira Soler, (1900–1998), Spanish (Catalan)/Cuban painter
Anton Solomoukha (born 1945), Soviet/French artist and photographer
Konstantin Somov (1869–1939), Russian/French artist
Jens Søndergaard (1895–1957), Danish painter
Song Maojin (宋懋晉, fl. 14th, 15th or 16th c.), Chinese painter
Song Xu (宋旭, born 1525), Chinese painter and Buddhist priest
Rajesh Soni (born 1981), Indian artist and photographer
David G. Sorensen (1937–2011), Canadian artist
Hendrik Martenszoon Sorgh (1610–1670), Dutch painter
Joaquín Sorolla (1863–1923), Spanish painter
John Souch (1593/1594–1645), English portrait painter
Pierre Soulages (1919–2022), French painter, engraver and sculptor
Camille Souter (born 1929), Irish painter
Chaïm Soutine (1894–1944), Russian/French painter
Amadeo de Souza Cardoso (1887–1918), Portuguese painter
Isaac Soyer (1902–1981), American painter
Moses Soyer (1899–1974), American painter
Raphael Soyer (1899–1987), American painter, draftsman and print-maker
Austin Osman Spare (1886–1956), English draftsman, painter and oculist
Stanley Spencer (1891–1959), English painter
Nancy Spero (1926–2009), American visual artist
Carl Spitzweg (1808–1885), German painter
Sebastian Spreng (born 1956), Argentine/American visual artist and writer on music
Ignatius Sserulyo (born 1937), Ugandan painter
Nicolas de Staël (1914–1955), French painter
Jan Stanisławski (1860–1907), Austro-Hungarian (Polish) painter
Otto Stark (1859–1926), American artist, print-maker and illustrator
Wojciech Korneli Stattler (1800–1875), Polish painter and professor
Christian W. Staudinger (born 1952), German sculptor, painter and poet
Karl Stauffer-Bern (1857–1891), Swiss painter, etcher and sculptor
Henryk Stażewski (1894–1988), Polish painter
Karel Štěch (1908–1982), Czechoslovak painter, graphic designer and illustrator
T. C. Steele (1847–1926), American painter
John Steell (1804–1891), Scottish sculptor
Jan Steen (c. 1626 – 1679), Dutch painter
Hendrik van Steenwijk I (1550–1603), Dutch/German painter
Hendrik van Steenwijk II (1580–1649), Flemish/Dutch painter
Philip Wilson Steer (1860–1942), English painter and art teacher
Joe Stefanelli (born 1921), American painter
Johann Gottfried Steffan (1815–1905), Swiss/German landscape painter
Georges Stein (1818–1890), French painter
Jacob Steinhardt (1887–1968), German/Israeli painter and woodcut artist
Eduard von Steinle (1810–1886), Austrian/German painter
Théophile Steinlen (1859–1923), Swiss/French painter and print-maker
Juan Carlos Stekelman (born 1936), Argentine painter and print-maker
Frank Stella (born 1936), American painter, sculptor and print-maker
Joseph Stella (1877–1946), Italian/American painter
Hedda Sterne (1910–2011), Romanian/American artist
Matej Sternen (1870–1949), Austro-Hungarian (Slovenian)/Yugoslav painter
David Watson Stevenson (1842–1904), Scottish sculptor
Helen Stevenson (fl. 1920–1935), Scottish artist and print-maker
Robert Macaulay Stevenson (1854–1952), Scottish painter
William Grant Stevenson (1849–1919), Scottish sculptor and painter
Andrew Stevovich (born 1948), American painter
Julius LeBlanc Stewart (1855–1919), American/French painter
LeConte Stewart (1891–1990), American artist and Mormon
Knute Stiles (1923-2009), American painter, collagist, art critic, teacher, poet
Clyfford Still (1904–1980), American painter
Tobias Stimmer (1539–1584), Swiss painter and illustrator
Andries Stock, Dutch Baroque painter (1580–1648)
Stan Stokes (living), American painter
Matthias Stom (c. 1600 – c. 1652), Dutch or Flemish/Italian painter
Abraham Storck (1644–1708), Dutch painter and draftsman
Thomas Stothard (1755–1834), English painter, illustrator and engraver
William Stott (1857–1900), English painter
Hendrick van Streeck (1659 – post–1720), Dutch painter of interiors
Juriaen van Streeck (1632–1687), Dutch painter
Arthur Streeton (1867–1943), Australian painter
Bartholomeus Strobel (1591–1650), German/Polish painter
Ancell Stronach (1901–1981), Scottish artist
Joseph Dwight Strong (1853–1899), American artist and photographer
Bernardo Strozzi (1581–1644), Italian painter and engraver
Drew Struzan (born 1947), American artist, illustrator and poster designer
Zofia Stryjenska (1891–1976), Polish painter, illustrator and stage designer
Wladyslaw Strzeminski (1893–1952), Polish painter
Gilbert Stuart (1755–1828), American painter
George Stubbs (1724–1806), English painter
Franz Stuck (1863–1928), German painter, sculptor and architect
Walter Stuempfig (1914–1970), American artist and teacher
January Suchodolski (1797–1875), Polish painter and army officer
Serge Sudeikin (1882–1946), Russian artist and set designer
Sudip Roy (born 1960), Indian artist
Alberto Sughi (born 1928), Italian painter
Sugimura Jihei (杉村治平, fl. 1681–1703), Japanese ukiyo-e print-maker
Yasushi Sugiyama (杉山寧, 1909–1993), Japanese nihonga painter
William Holmes Sullivan (1836–1908), English history painter
Altoon Sultan (born 1948), American painter in egg tempera
Sava Šumanović (1896–1942), Yugoslav (Serbian) painter
Kelly Sueda (born 1972), American painter
Sun Junze (孙君泽, fl. 13th or 14th century), Chinese painter
Sun Kehong (孫克弘, 1533–1611), Chinese painter, calligrapher and poet
Sun Long (孫隆, fl. 14th century), Chinese painter
Victor Surbek (1885–1975), Swiss painter
Vasily Surikov (1848–1916), Russian painter
Alan Sutherland (born 1931), Scottish painter
David Macbeth Sutherland (1883–1973), Scottish artist and Director of Gray's School of Art
George B. Sutherland (fl. mid–20th century), American painter and teacher
Graham Sutherland (1903–1980), English painter and print-maker
Carol Sutton (born 1945), American painter
Linda Sutton (born 1947), English painter
Marc-Aurèle de Foy Suzor-Coté (1869–1937), Canadian painter and sculptor
Suzuki Harunobu (鈴木春信, 1724–1770), Japanese ukiyo-e woodblock print-maker
Max Švabinský (1873–1962), Austro-Hungarian (Czech)/Czechoslovak painter, draftsman and academy professor
Max Walter Svanberg (1912–1994), Swedish painter, illustrator and designer
Eva Švankmajerová (1940–2005), Czechoslovak/Czech artist 
Svend Rasmussen Svendsen (1864–1945), Norwegian/American artist
Sardar Sobha Singh (1901–1986), Indian painter
Sergei Sviatchenko (born 1952), Soviet (Ukrainian)/Danish collage artist
Herman van Swanevelt (1604–1655), Dutch painter and etcher
Roger Swainston (born 1960), Australian painter, naturalist and zoologist
Barbara Swan (1922–2003), American painter, illustrator, and lithographer 
Sigurd Swane (1879–1973), Danish painter and poet
Albert Swinden (1901–1961), American painter
Fedot Sychkov (1870–1958), Russian/Soviet painter
George Gardner Symons (1861/1863 – 1930), American painter
Bertalan Székely (1835–1910), Hungarian painter
Adam Szentpétery (born 1956), Hungarian painter
Józef Szermentowski (1833–1876), Polish painter
István Szőnyi (1894–1960), Hungarian painter
Lili Árkayné Sztehló (1897–1959), Hungarian painter and stained-glass decorator

References
References can be found under each entry.

S